Canada Carries On (French: En avant Canada) was a series of short films by the National Film Board of Canada which ran from 1940 to 1959.  The series was created as morale-boosting propaganda films during the Second World War. With the end of the war, the series lost its financial backing from the Wartime Information Board, but continued as an NFB series of theatrical shorts that included newsreels as well as animated shorts.

The series was initially produced by Stuart Legg, who also directed many of the early films. The first film in the series was Legg's Atlantic Patrol, released in April 1940, about the Royal Canadian Navy's role in protecting convoys from Halifax to the United Kingdom from U-boat attack. One of the most famous films from this series was his Churchill's Island, released in Canada in June 1941 and winner of the first Academy Award for Best Documentary (Short Subject).

The narrator for many of the films in the series was Lorne Greene, known for his work on radio broadcasts as a news announcer at CBC. His sonorous recitation led to his nickname, "The Voice of Canada", and when reading grim battle statistics, "The Voice of Doom".

The success of Canada Carries On inspired a second NFB series, The World in Action, which was more tailored to international audiences.

Canadian distribution
The series was produced in 35 mm for the theatrical market. Each film was shown in approximately 800 theatres across Canada over a six-month period. They were distributed by Columbia Pictures, and the NFB had an arrangement with Famous Players theatres to ensure that Canadians from coast to coast could see them. After the six-month theatrical tour ended, the films were made available on 16 mm to schools, libraries, church basements and factories, extending their life for another year or two. They were also made available to film libraries operated by university and provincial authorities. A total of 199 films were produced before the series ended in 1959.

En avant Canada
The French-language series En avant Canada was distributed in Quebec and New Brunswick by France Film Distribution in some 60 theatres. Eight to 12 films were produced each year in French; some were versions of English titles, others original, for a total of 173 French titles before the program's end in 1959.

International distribution
Some films were distributed internationally in Australia, the UK and the United States (by Telenews), in India (by Fox Film Corporation) and the West Indies (by Inter-continental). These were usually titles that dealt with international rather than Canadian issues. One such film was Warclouds in the Pacific, released just one week before the attack on Pearl Harbor, warning of an imminent Japanese attack.

Films in series

1940

1941

1942

1943

1944

1945

1946

1947

1948

1949

1950

1951

1952

1953

1954

1955

1956

1957

1958

1959

1960

References

Notes

Bibliography

 Bennett, Linda Greene. My Father's Voice: The Biography of Lorne Greene. Bloomington, Indiana: iUniverse, Inc., 2004. .
 Ellis, Jack C. and Betsy A. McLane. New History of Documentary Film. London: Continuum International Publishing Group, 2005. .
 Goetz, William."he Canadian Wartime Documentary: "Canada Carries on" and "The World in Action". Cinema Journal, 16, 1977, pp. 59–80.
 Khouri, Malek. Filming Politics: Communism and the Portrayal of the Working Class at the National Film Board of Canada, 1939-46. Calgary, Alberta, Canada: University of Calgary Press, 2007. .
 Lerner, Loren. Canadian Film and Video: A Bibliography and Guide to the Literature. Toronto: University of Toronto Press, 1997. .

External links
 Complete list of Canada Carries On films at NFB Collections page

 
Film series introduced in 1940
 
Newsreels
National Film Board of Canada documentary series
 
Lists of Canadian films
Short film series
1940s Canadian films